St. Mary's Convent Inter College, Allahabad, Uttar Pradesh, India, is a girls school run by the Sisters of the Congregation of Jesus in collaboration with a lay staff members. It was founded in 1866 by Mother Mary Ward for the education of girls. The Delhi and the Lucknow campuses are co-educational.

The college was founded to provide an education to all sections of society, regardless of caste, creed or financial status. The children are prepared for the ICSE Examination at the class 10 level, the ISC at the +2 level conducted by the CISCE Delhi.

The institution, established and administered by the Christian Society, comes under articles 29 and 30 of the Indian Constitution and for Religious Jurisdiction it comes directly under the Roman Catholic Diocese of Allahabad .

The principal of the school is Sister Jyoti CJ. The school includes the Teachers Training Center, a school for would-be-teachers. It also runs a school for underprivileged children called Asha Deep.

The motto of the school is "Hope Lightens Work" (from the Latin version - Spe Labor Levis').

Members of the student council are selected each year, including the Head Girl, Vice Head Girl, House Captains, House Vice Captains, Student Editor and Sub-Editor, USM President and vice-president, Games Captain, Games Vice Captain.

St Mary's celebrated 150 years of its existence in the year 2016.

History
The history of St. Mary's Convent Inter College, Allahabad, rests on the foundation of the Congregation of Jesus by venerable Mary Ward (nun) who founded the Institute in 1609, to cater to the education of girls, with the special emphasis on moral and spiritual foundation. Inspired by her zeal and enthusiasm, the CJ sisters came to India at an invitation from Bishop Anastasius Hartmann, to the then Superior General of the CJ sisters, Mother Catherine de Graccho, in Nymphenburg Germany. The pioneers to India, a group of five young sisters from Germany set out in 1853 across the oceans to the unknown strange land of India. After reaching Bombay by ship, they embarked upon a perilous journey across the vast peninsula of India in a bullock cart and reached Patna, where they founded the first house and school in India, St. Joseph's Convent High School, Patna. In the years that followed, these brave women and others who followed them worked whole heartedly to spread God'sKingdom in the Indian subcontinent , establishing new convents and reaching out to the poor and needy in the northern parts of India through the ministries of education , health care , care of youth and orphans. In the year 1866 ,Bishop Anastasius Hartmann intended to open a new Convent of the IBMV (Sisters of Loreto) in Allahabad and appealed to Mother General for more sisters. By the time the 8th Party of sisters arrived in India , the Convent and Boarding school at Phaphamau was almost ready. The sisters moved into the convent of January 1ih, 1866.

On January 15, 1866 , the boarding school was opened with two pupils , Mary Elise and Nina Frizzone. Though the number of students increased gradually , since the sisters had to face endless problems in Phaphamau , they first shifted to Elgin Road in Allahabad , then temporarily to Lowther Castle and finally in February 1888 (or 1886), to 32 Thornhill Road (Maharishi Dayanand Road), where the school is situated today.  The Roman Catholic Diocese of Allahabad had offered a piece of leased land, within the campus of St. Joseph's Cathedral, Allahabad to the sisters to build their school, where a spacious red - brick building had been erected.  The original building exists to this day, and is considered one of the heritage buildings of the city on account of its unique architectural style.  Around it many other structures have been constructed in the course of years to accommodate the ever increasing number of students. DELVING INTO THE PAST St. Mary's Convent is a name synonymous with education, values, culture and sense of responsibility.

Notable alumni
Throughout its history a sizable number of alumni have become notable in various fields. 
 Indira Gandhi, a key 20th-century stateswoman, a central figure of the Indian National Congress party, and to date the only female Prime Minister of India intermittently attended this premier institution until her matriculation in 1934. 
 Shubha Mudgal, a well-known Indian singer of Hindustani classical music.
 Dr.Deepali Pant Joshi, executive director of Reserve Bank of India. 
 Neelum Saran Gour, an author, translator, academic and chronicler of various facets of Allahabad city.
 Shahnaz Husain an Indian entrepreneur. 
 Leema Dhar, a novelist and poet.
 Dr. Shuchi Grover, a learning scientist and computer science education researcher
 shreeradhe khanduja, splitvilla contestant and model.
 Nidhi Singh, an Indian Television and Film actor.
 Rita Bahuguna Joshi an Indian politician and ex-cabinet minister in the Government of Uttar Pradesh. 
 Aradhana Mishra also known as Mona Misra, an Indian politician and member of 17th Legislative Assembly of Uttar Pradesh also studied here.
 Geetanjali Shree is the first Hindi novelist to receive International Booker Prize in 2022.

Lucknow
Another branch of St. Mary's is in RDSO Colony, Manak Nagar, Lucknow, Uttar Pradesh. The principal of the school is Sr. Lissy CJ and the manager is Sr.  Mariette CJ. The motto of the school is "Efforts Spell Success". Unlike the Allahabad branch, this branch happens to be a co-educational institute.
The office bearers in this branch include the Head Boy, Head Girl, House captains, Games captains, and class monitors. The class monitors of year 12 acts as the prefects of the college.

References

External links
 |
[official website Lucknow|http://smccjlko.org]http://www.cjsmciclko.org/principal.php

 http://www.cjsmciclko.org/principal.php

Catholic schools in India
Girls' schools in Uttar Pradesh
Intermediate colleges in Uttar Pradesh
Christian schools in Uttar Pradesh
Schools in Allahabad
Educational institutions established in 1866
1866 establishments in India